Middle Island on Barrow Island, Western Australia.

References

Islands of the Pilbara